The Graduate School of Arts and Sciences (GSAS) is the largest of the twelve graduate schools of Harvard University. Formed in 1872, GSAS is responsible for most of Harvard's graduate degree programs in the humanities, social sciences, and natural sciences. The school offers Master of Arts (AM), Master of Science (SM), and Doctor of Philosophy (PhD) degrees in approximately 58 disciplines.

Academic programs offered by the Harvard Graduate School of Arts and Sciences have consistently ranked at the top of graduate programs in the United States. The School's graduates include a diverse set of prominent public figures and academics. The vast majority of Harvard's Nobel Prize-winning alumni earned a degree at GSAS. In addition to scholars and scientists, GSAS graduates have become U.S. Cabinet Secretaries, Supreme Court Justices, foreign heads of state, and heads of government.

History and organization
GSAS was formally created as the Graduate Department of Harvard University in 1872 and was renamed the Graduate School of Harvard University in 1890. Women were not allowed to enroll in GSAS until 1962.

The Graduate School of Arts and Sciences forms part of the Faculty of Arts and Sciences (FAS), along with Harvard College, the Harvard John A. Paulson School of Engineering and Applied Sciences, and the Harvard Division of Continuing Education. The dean of the Graduate School of Arts and Sciences, who reports to the dean of the Faculty of Arts and Sciences, is charged with the responsibility of implementing and supervising the policies of the faculty in the area of graduate education. In the administration of academic policy, the dean is guided by the Administrative Board and the Committee on Graduate Education. The dean is assisted by an administrative dean of GSAS, who has day-to-day responsibility for the operations of the school, a dean for admissions and financial aid, and a dean for student affairs. While the GSAS office oversees the processing of applications, financial aid and fellowships, thesis guidelines, and graduate student affairs, the individual departments in FAS retain considerable autonomy in the administration of their respective graduate programs.

The Faculty of Arts and Sciences oversees GSAS and is responsible for setting the conditions of admission, for providing courses of instruction for students, for directing their studies and examining them in their fields of study, for establishing and maintaining the requirements for its degrees and for making recommendations for those degrees to Harvard's Governing Boards, for laying down regulations for the governance of the school, and for supervising all its affairs. The dean of GSAS is responsible for implementing and supervising the policies of the faculty in the area of graduate education.

In addition to its own master's and PhD programs, GSAS nominally oversees the PhD programs in Harvard's professional schools: Harvard Business School, Harvard Divinity School, the Harvard Graduate School of Education, Harvard Medical School, the Harvard T. H. Chan School of Public Health, the Harvard Graduate School of Design, and the John F. Kennedy School of Government.

Academic programs

The Graduate School of Arts and Sciences offers many degree programs, including:

 African and African American Studies
 American Studies
 Anthropology
 Astronomy
 Bioengineering
 Celtic Languages and Literatures
 Chemistry and Chemical Biology
 Computer Science
 The Classics
 Comparative Literature
 Earth and Planetary Sciences 
 East Asian Languages and Civilizations
 Economics
 Education
 Engineering and Applied Sciences
 English
 Germanic Languages and Literatures
 Government
 History
 History of Art and Architecture
 History of Science
 Human Evolutionary Biology
 Linguistics
 Mathematics
 Middle Eastern Studies
 Molecular and Cellular Biology
 Music
 Near Eastern Languages and Civilizations
 Organismic and Evolutionary Biology
 Philosophy
 Physics
 Psychology
 Romance Languages and Literatures
 Slavic Languages and Literatures
 Sociology
 South Asian Studies
 Statistics
 Stem Cell and Regenerative Biology

Student life

As of 2019, Harvard's Graduate School of Arts and Sciences had 4,521 students, with the vast majority (4,392 students) pursuing PhDs. 46% of GSAS students are women, 30% of students are international, and 12% are underrepresented minorities. 20% of GSAS students pursue degrees in humanities, 26% in social sciences, and the remaining 54% in natural sciences.

GSAS students have a dedicated space on Harvard Yard, known as The GSAS Student Center at Lehman Hall. Graduate students who prefer to dine on-campus do so at the GSAS Student Center, which features a full-scale dining hall as well as a smaller cafe. The building also provides study and leisure spaces.

Financial aid
GSAS guarantees full funding for all PhD students for five years, which covers tuition, health fees, and living expenses. The PhD funding packages include a combination of tuition grants, stipends, traineeships, teaching fellowships, research assistantships, and other academic appointments. Although master's students are not guaranteed full funding, they often receive financial support covering at least half of tuition and fees.

Housing

As of 2017, Harvard's GSAS guarantees housing for all first-year graduate students, as long as the students apply for accommodations by April 22. GSAS offers housing through several on-campus residence halls, as well as Harvard-owned apartments, both on and off-campus. In addition, approximately 100 GSAS students live in Harvard's undergraduate houses and freshman dorms as resident tutors and proctors.  GSAS residence halls include the following:

Conant Hall
Constructed in 1894, Conant Hall was designed by Shepley, Rutan and Coolidge, reflecting the Georgian architecture of freshman residences found around Harvard Yard. It was built with funds gifted by Edwin Conant, whose name the building currently bears. Originally consisting of 29 suites, Conant has since undergone numerous renovations and currently houses 84 single rooms.

Perkins Hall
Perkins Hall was built in 1893 according to the design of Shepley, Rutan and Coolidge. Consisting of 154 single rooms, Perkins is the oldest of the GSAS residence halls currently in use at Harvard. The funds for its construction were donated by Catharine Page Perkins, the widow of an oil tycoon, in memory of her husband's family. Perkins was originally intended to house undergraduate students from modest circumstances but as the number of graduate students increased, it was converted into a graduate residence. In the early 1900s, Perkins Hall was at the center of controversy involving "homosexual activity" at Harvard, and the university administration's attempts to suppress it, an affair that later became known as the Secret Court of 1920.

Richards Hall and Child Hall
Designed by the German modernist architect Walter Gropius, Richards and Child Halls were built in 1949. Richards is named after the Nobel Prize-winning chemist Theodore Richards, while Child Hall takes its name from Francis J. Child. The two residence halls are constructed on the former Jarvis Field, where the first American football game was played in 1874. Child Hall houses approximately 100 students and Richards Hall houses over 70. The lawn space includes Richard Lippold's “World Tree” sculpture, a 27-feet-tall steel construction designed to be climbed by students.

References

External links
GSAS website
Harvard Schools
GSAS 150th Anniversary
Our History Is a Treasure Box
All at Their Best

Graduate School of Arts and Sciences
Graduate schools in the United States
Harvard Faculty of Arts and Sciences